PmiRKB is a database of plant miRNAs.

See also
 MiRTarBase
 MESAdb
 microRNA

References

External links
 http://bis.zju.edu.cn/pmirkb/

Biological databases
RNA
MicroRNA